Maladzyechna (also Molodechno) was an air base in Belarus located 8 km south of Maladzyechna.  It was a 1960s-era attack or interceptor base.  Towards the end of the Cold War it was plowed under for farmland.  The geometrics remained visible on Google Earth imagery as of 2006, and a small propeller airplane was visible suggesting the airfield has remained as a minor airstrip.

References
RussianAirFields.com

Soviet Air Force bases
Military installations of Belarus
Airports in Belarus

Belarusian Air Force